Amblypodia annetta is a species of butterfly belonging to the lycaenid family described by Otto Staudinger in 1888. It is found in the Australasian realm.

Subspecies
A a. annetta Bachan
A. a. annettina Fruhstorfer, 1903  Obi
A. a. elga Fruhstorfer, 1907 Obi
A. a. anna Staudinger, 1888   Ambon, Serang, Saparua
A. a. faisina Ribbe, 1899 Faisi Island
A. a. fabiana Fruhstorfer, 1907 Waigeu
A. a. eberalda Fruhstorfer, 1907 New Guinea

Biology
The larva feeds on Salacia primodes.

References

External links

"Amblypodia Horsfield, [1829]" at Markku Savela's Lepidoptera and Some Other Life Forms. Retrieved June 6, 2017.

Amblypodia
Butterflies described in 1888